Nancy Faeser (born 13 July 1970) is a German lawyer and politician of the Social Democratic Party (SPD), serving as Federal Minister of the Interior and Community in Chancellor Olaf Scholz's cabinet since 2021. She served as a member of the State Parliament of Hesse from the 2003 elections until 2021. In 2019, she became the party's leader in Hesse, as well as the leader of the Opposition in the Landtag of Hesse.

Education and early career
Faeser went to elementary school in Schwalbach am Taunus, a suburb of Frankfurt am Main, and passed her high school diploma (German: Abitur) at the Albert-Einstein-Gymnasium.

From 1990 to 2000 Faeser studied law at the Johann Wolfgang Goethe University in Frankfurt. She completed a semester abroad at the New College of California and graduated with her second state bar exam as a licensed attorney.

Until 2000, Faeser worked as a research assistant at Clifford Chance in Frankfurt am Main and then, after her bar exam, worked as a full-time lawyer at Clifford Chance from 2000 to 2007.

Political career

Career in state politics 
Faeser joined the SPD in 1988.

In parliament, Faeser served as a member of the Committee on Legal Affairs (2003–2009), the Committee on the Election of Judges (2003–2013), the Committee on Economic Affairs, Energy and Transport (2014–2018) and the Committee on Internal Affairs (since 2009). From 2009, she was her parliamentary group's spokesperson on internal affairs. 

In the 2013 Hesse state election, Faeser was the shadow minister for internal affairs in the campaign team of SPD candidate Thorsten Schäfer-Gümbel. In 2019, she was elected her parliamentary group's chairwoman.

Minister of the Interior, 2021–present 
In the negotiations to form a so-called traffic light coalition of the SPD, the Green Party and the Free Democrats (FDP) following the 2021 German elections, Faeser was part of her party's delegation in the working group on migration and integration, co-chaired by Boris Pistorius, Luise Amtsberg and Joachim Stamp. 

After the coalition was successfully formed, on 6 December 2021, it was announced that Faeser would become the first female Interior Minister of Germany in the German government in the Scholz cabinet. In her capacity as minister, Faeser also takes part in the meetings of the Standing Conference of Interior Ministers and Senators of the States (IMK).

Faeser was nominated by her party as delegate to the Federal Convention for the purpose of electing the President of Germany in 2022.

In her first year in office, Faeser extended border checks at crossings from Austria for six months after a rise in the number of migrants arriving via the Western Balkans route. In September 2022, the Ministry of the Interior under Faeser closed the "Expert Group on Political Islamism" set up by her predecessor, Horst Seehofer. In October 2022, she expressed concerns about the increased number of migrants entering Europe via the Balkan route. 

Prior to the 2022 FIFA World Cup in Qatar, when asked in an interview with ARD's Monitor about the awarding of the event to the country, she emphasised that awarding major sporting events should be linked to compliance with human rights and principles of sustainability, by saying: "There are criteria that must be adhered to and it would be better that tournaments are not awarded to such states." In response, the Gulf Cooperation Council condemned the remarks, and Qatar summoned the German ambassador to protest against her comments. Faeser attended Germany's first game at the World Cup on 23 November where she wore a OneLove armband (a pro LGBTQ+ symbol) which FIFA had prevented players from wearing in the tournament with threats of sanctions.

Other activities 
 German Foundation for Active Citizenship and Volunteering (DSEE), Ex-Officio Member of the Board of Trustees (since 2022)
 Business Forum of the Social Democratic Party of Germany, Member of the Political Advisory Board (since 2022)
 Max Planck Institute for the Study of Crime, Security and Law, Member of the Board of Trustees 
 EBS Law School, Member of the Board of Trustees
 Hessischer Rundfunk, Member of the Broadcasting Council

Personal life
Faeser has been married to lawyer Eyke Grüning since 2012.  The couple have a son and live in Schwalbach am Taunus.

References 

1970 births
Living people
21st-century German women politicians
Female interior ministers
Interior ministers of Germany
Members of the Landtag of Hesse
Politicians from Hesse
Social Democratic Party of Germany politicians